The NYPD Transportation Bureau is one of the ten bureaus that comprise the New York City Police Department and is currently headed by Bureau Chief Kim Royster 

The Transportation Bureau's responsibilities include traffic enforcement, traffic management, and highway safety.

Units within the New York City Police Department Transportation Bureau include the:
Traffic Management Center
TrafficStat Unit
Investigations Unit
Highway District
Highway Unit 1 (Bronx and Manhattan)
Collision Investigation Squad
Collision Technician Group
Highway Unit 2 (Brooklyn)
Collision Investigation Squad
Collision Technician Group
Highway Unit 3 (Queens)
Collision Investigation Squad
Collision Technician Group
Highway Unit 5 (Staten Island)
Collision Investigation Squad
Traffic Operations District
Special Events Unit
Citywide Traffic Task Force
Citywide Traffic Task Force Auxiliary Unit
Bus Unit
Taxi Unit
Traffic Enforcement District
Intersection Control Section
North Intersection Control
South Intersection Control
Tow Operations Section
Manhattan Tow Pound Unit
Bronx Tow Pound Unit
Brooklyn Tow Pound Unit
Queens Tow Pound Unit
Traffic Special Operations Section
Construction Compliance Unit
Intersection Response & Special Events Unit
Mobile Response Unit
Truck Enforcement Unit
Highway Emergency Local Patrol Unit
Manhattan Summons Enforcement Section
Manhattan South Traffic Enforcement Unit
Manhattan North Traffic Enforcement Unit
Citywide Boro Summons Enforcement Section
Bronx Traffic Enforcement Unit
Brooklyn South Traffic Enforcement Unit
Brooklyn North Traffic Enforcement Unit
Queens South Traffic Enforcement Unit 
Queens North Traffic Enforcement Unit
Staten Island Traffic Enforcement Unit

The Transportation Bureau also included the Transit Division from 1997 to 1999. That division was upgraded to bureau status, as it once had from 1995 to 1997 and again in 1999.

A history of the NYPD Traffic Control Division was published on the NYPD Web site as of 2007, but was subsequently removed.

See also 

 New York City Police Department
 New York City Police Department Highway Patrol
 New York City Transit Police
 Transportation in New York City

References

Transportation in New York City
Transportation Bureau